Tsuranov is a Russian masculine surname, its feminine counterpart is Tsuranova. It may refer to
Konstantin Tsuranov (born 1972), Russian sport shooter
Yury Tsuranov (1936–2008), Russia sports shooter, father of Konstantin

Russian-language surnames